John Lewis "Jan" Hall (born August 21, 1934) is an American physicist, and Nobel laureate in physics.  He shared the 2005 Nobel Prize in Physics with Theodor W. Hänsch and Roy Glauber for his work in precision spectroscopy.

Biography

Born in Denver, Colorado, Hall holds three degrees from Carnegie Institute of Technology, a B.S. in 1956, an M.S. in 1958, and a Ph.D. in 1961.  He completed his postdoctoral studies at the Department of Commerce's National Bureau of Standards, now the National Institute of Standards and Technology (NIST), where he remained from 1962 until his retirement in 2004. He has lectured at the University of Colorado Boulder since 1967.

Hall is currently a NIST Senior Fellow, Emeritus and remains a Fellow at JILA, formerly the Joint Institute for Laboratory Astrophysics, and Lecturer at the CU-Boulder Physics Department. JILA is a research institute managed jointly by CU-Boulder and NIST.

Hall shared half of the Nobel prize with Theodor W. Hänsch for their pioneering work on laser-based precision spectroscopy and the optical frequency comb technique.  The other half of the prize was awarded to Roy J. Glauber.

Hall has received many other honors for his pioneering work, including the Optical Society of America's Max Born Award "for pioneering the field of stable lasers, including their applications in fundamental physics and, most recently, in the stabilization of femtosecond lasers to provide dramatic advances in optical frequency metrology".

Hall is one of the 20 American recipients of the Nobel Prize in Physics to sign a letter addressed to President George W. Bush in May 2008, urging him to "reverse the damage done to basic science research in the Fiscal Year 2008 Omnibus Appropriations Bill" by requesting additional emergency funding for the Department of Energy’s Office of Science, the National Science Foundation, and the National Institute of Standards and Technology.

In 2015, Hall signed the Mainau Declaration 2015 on Climate Change on the final day of the 65th Lindau Nobel Laureate Meeting. The declaration was signed by a total of 76 Nobel Laureates and handed to then-President of the French Republic, François Hollande, as part of the successful COP21 climate summit in Paris.

Honours and awards

National Carbon Company Fellow in Physics, 1957–1961
Department of Commerce Gold Medal, 1969
Samuel W. Stratton Award, 1971
Department of Commerce Gold Medal, 1974 (group awards)
IR-100: Laser stabilizer selected as one of "100 best new products of the year," 1975
IR-100: Laser wavelength meter ("Lambdameter") selected as one of "100 best new products of the year," 1977
E. U. Condon Award, 1979
Charles Hard Townes Award of the Optical Society of America, 1984, jointly with V. P. Chebotayev (Academy of Sciences, USSR)
Davisson-Germer Prize of the American Physical Society, 1988
Docteur Honoris Causa de l'Universite Paris Nord, 1989
Frederic Ives Medal of the Optical Society of America, 1991
Einstein Prize for Laser Science, 1992
Arthur L. Shawlow Prize of the American Physical Society, 1993
Allen V. Astin Measurement Science Award, 2000
Max Born Award of the Optical Society of America, 2002
Presidential Rank Award from the Office of Personnel Management, 2002
Department of Commerce Gold Medal, 2002 (group awards)
Rabi Award of the IEEE Ultrasonics, Ferroelectrics, and Frequency Control Society, 2004
Légion d'Honneur Membership, 2004
Nobel Prize in Physics, 2005
Golden Plate Award of the American Academy of Achievement, 2006
Doctor of Science, honoris causa, University of Glasgow, 2007

References

External links

 
 CV and publication list
 National Institute of Standards and Technology (NIST)
 JILA
 U.S. Patent 6201638 Comb generating optical cavity that includes an optical amplifier and an optical modulator (John Lewis Hall)
 Hall's website
Group photograph taken at Lasers '92 including, right to left, Marlan Scully, Willis Lamb, John L. Hall, and F. J. Duarte.

1934 births
Living people
People from Denver
Alumni of the University of Glasgow
American Nobel laureates
21st-century American physicists
Optical physicists
Laser researchers
Carnegie Mellon University alumni
Nobel laureates in Physics
University of Colorado Boulder faculty
Honorary members of Optica (society)
Fellows of Optica (society)
Department of Commerce Gold Medal
Members of the United States National Academy of Sciences
Spectroscopists
Fellows of the American Physical Society